CMAA may refer to:

Computer Graphics

Conservative Morphological Anti-Aliasing, an AA technique that is almost as fast as FXAA (Fast Approximate Anti-Aliasing) but with much less blurring.

Organizations
California Museum of Ancient Art
Cambodian Mine Action and Victim Assistance Authority
Church Music Association of America, the association of Catholic musicians
Club Managers' Association Australia, an Australian trade union
Club Managers Association of America, professional association for managers of membership clubs
Comics Magazine Association of America, a United States organization to regulate the content of comic books
Construction Management Association of America
Country Music Association of Australia
Crane Manufacturer's Association of America, a trade organization of leading electric overhead traveling crane manufacturers in the United States

Music
Country Music Awards of Australia